T.C. Mits (acronym for "the celebrated man in the street"), is a term coined by Lillian Rosanoff Lieber to refer to an everyman. In Lieber's works, T.C. Mits was a character who made scientific topics more approachable to the public audience.

The phrase has enjoyed sparse use by authors in fields such as molecular biology, secondary education, and general semantics.

The Education of T.C. MITS
Dr. Lillian Rosanoff Lieber wrote this treatise on mathematical thinking in twenty chapters. The writing took a form that resembled free-verse poetry, though Lieber included an introduction stating that the form was meant only to facilitate rapid reading, rather than emulate free-verse. Lieber's husband, a fellow professor at Long Island University, Hugh Gray Lieber, provided illustrations for the book. The title of the book was meant to emphasize that mathematics can be understood by anyone, which was further shown when a special "Overseas edition for the Armed Forces" was published in 1942, and approved by the Council on Books in Wartime to be sent to American troops fighting in World War II.

See also

 John Doe
 The man on the Clapham omnibus

References

Mathematics literature
Acronyms
Mathematical terminology